Jeremiah Kipkorir Mutai (born 27 December 1992) is a Kenyan middle-distance runner specialising in the 800 metres. Earlier in his career he competed in the 400 metres hurdles. He represented his country at one outdoor and two indoor World Championships.

Competition record

Personal bests
Outdoor
400 metres – 46.72 (Nairobi 2011)
800 metres – 1:44.59 (Nairobi 2013)
1000 metres – 2:18.17 (Tomblaine 2014)
400 metres hurdles – 51.12 (Nairobi 2010)

Indoor
600 metres – 1:16.52 (Glasgow 2014)
800 metres – 1:45.93 (Birmingham 2015)

References

1992 births
Living people
Place of birth missing (living people)
Kenyan male middle-distance runners
Kenyan male hurdlers
World Athletics Championships athletes for Kenya
21st-century Kenyan people